Anatolie Nosatîi (born 12 September 1972) is the Minister of Defence of the Republic of Moldova.

Early life and career
From 1987 to 1990, he studied at the Frunze Republican Boarding School in  the Moldovan capital. After 1990, he studied in Ukraine, attending a command school in Kyiv before going to study at the Military Academy in Odessa. From 1994-2000, he served at the Chisinau Military College (now the Alexandru cel Bun Military Academy), rising to the post of battalion commander. In the early years of the 2000s, he commanded the 22nd Peacekeeping Battalion. In that decade, he received American education within the United States Armed Forces: first at the Defense Language Institute (1999), the Army Engineer School (1999), the Army Command and General Staff College (2005), and the National Defense University (2012). Over the course of six years until December 2014, he operated in the bureaucracy of the General Staff, before briefly serving as the Moldovan military advisor at the United Nations Department of Peace Operations.

Minister of Defence
He was appointed on 6 August 2021 as part of the Gavrilița Cabinet. On 6 August, Nosatii was introduced by President Maia Sandu and Premier Natalia Gavrilița to the command of the Moldovan National Army. Nosatii met a couple of weeks later with his Ukrainian counterpart Andriy Taran in Kyiv on Ukrainian Independence Day to strengthen his country's cooperation with that the Ukrainian Armed Forces.

Personal life
He speaks four languages: Romanian, English, Russian, and the French. He has been awarded the Orders of Loyalty to the Motherland, the United Nations Medal, and the Bronze Star Medal.

Note

1972 births
Living people
Politicians from Chișinău
Government ministers of Moldova